Bangia is an extant genus of division Rhodophyta that grows in marine or freshwater habitats. Bangia has small thalli with rapid growth and high reproductive output, and exhibits behavior characteristic of r-selected species. The plants are attached by down-growing rhizoids, usually in dense purple-black to rust-colored clumps. The chloroplasts of Bangia, like others in the division Rhodophyta, contain chlorophyll a and sometimes chlorophyll d, as well as accessory pigments such as phycobilin pigments and xanthophylls. Depending on the relative proportions of these pigments and the light conditions, the overall color of the plant can range from green to red to purple to grey; however, the red pigment, phycoerythrin, is usually dominant.

Species 

Bangia aeruginosa Sprengel
Bangia amethystina Kützing
Bangia anisogona Meneghini
Bangia annulina (Roth) Sprengel
Bangia atropurpurea (Mertens ex Roth) C.Agardh
Bangia atropurpurea f. ferruginea Migula
Bangia atropurpurea f. muscicola Marcucci & Beccari
Bangia atropurpurea f. tenuis Collins
Bangia atropurpurea subsp. brevisegmenta Womersley
Bangia atropurpurea subsp. coccinea (Kützing) De Toni
Bangia atropurpurea subsp. roseopurpurea (Kützing) De Toni
Bangia atropurpurea var. anisogona (Meneghini) Kützing
Bangia atropurpurea var. breviarticulata Baglietto
Bangia atropurpurea var. coccineopurpurea (Kützing) Rabenhorst
Bangia atropurpurea var. elongata Brébisson
Bangia atropurpurea var. elongata C.Agardh
Bangia atropurpurea var. ferruginea (Kerner) Rabenhorst
Bangia atropurpurea var. heteronema Derbès & Solier
Bangia atropurpurea var. muscicola De Notaris
Bangia atropurpurea var. pacifica J.Agardh
Bangia atropurpurea var. roseopurpurea (Kützing) Rabenhorst
Bangia atrovirens Lyngbye
Bangia biseriata Meneghini
Bangia breviarticulata C.K.Tseng
Bangia callicoma Meneghini
Bangia carnea (Dillwyn) Harvey
Bangia coccineopurpurea Kützing
Bangia condensata Zanardini
Bangia confervoides Zanardini
Bangia crispula Chauvin
Bangia discoidea A.Aziz
Bangia dura Zanardini
Bangia enteromorphoides E.Y.Dawson
Bangia fergusonii Grunow
Bangia ferruginea Kerner
Bangia flocculosa Schousboe
Bangia foetida Sprengel
Bangia foetida Steudel
Bangia foliacea Schousboe
Bangia fulvescens (C.Agardh) J.Agardh
Bangia fuscopurpurea (Dillwyn) Lyngbye
Bangia fuscopurpurea f. viridis Wittrock & Nordstedt
Bangia fuscopurpurea var. concatenata Kützing
Bangia fuscopurpurea var. crinalis De Notaris
Bangia fuscopurpurea var. crispa Holmes & Batters
Bangia fusco-purpurea var. fuscenses W.J.Hooker
Bangia fuscopurpurea var. jadertina Kützing
Bangia fuscopurpurea var. pilosella Ardissone
Bangia fuscopurpurea var. setacea Kützing
Bangia gloiopeltidicola Tanaka
Bangia grateloupicola P.Crouan & H.Crouan
Bangia halymeniae M.J.Wynne
Bangia harveyi Areschoug
Bangia homotrichoides Kützing
Bangia intricata Brébisson & Godey
Bangia intricata Suhr ex Rabenhorst
Bangia kerkensis Meneghini
Bangia lacustris Carmichael
Bangia lanuginosa Harvey
Bangia latissima Meneghini
Bangia malacensis (Kützing) Kützing
Bangia maxima Gardner
Bangia punctulata Schousboe
Bangia purpurea Schousboe
Bangia quadripunctata Lyngbye
Bangia radicula B.F.Zheng & J.Li
Bangia sericea Bory
Bangia simplex A.H.S.Lucas
Bangia tanakae Pham-Hoàng Hô
Bangia tavarisii Welwitsch
Bangia tenuis N.L.Gardner
Bangia thaerasiae Bory
Bangia trichodes Schousboe
Bangia vermicularis Harvey
Bangia viridis Lyngbye
Bangia yamadae Tanaka

Description 
Bangia is a red alga that arises from a discoid holdfast and short stipe consisting of the extensions of rhizoidal cells. Bangia has unbranched, erect thalli forming initially uniseriate filaments becoming multiseriate at maturity. The plant is composed of filiform, unbranched cylinders of cells embedded in a firm gelatinous matrix. The cell contains a stellate chloroplast with prominent pyrenoid, as well as single thylakoids (characteristic of division Rhodophyta). The growth of Bangia is diffuse and intercalary, and each cell is quadrate to rectangular in shape. Primary pitt connections are absent in all but the conchocelis stage.

Distribution 
Bangia grows in freshwater or in marine habitats, usually forming dense clumps or mats, and occur throughout the intertidal area and subtidally to the maximum depth at which benthic algae occur. The plants are usually attached to a solid substratum (rock or shell), but can also occur as epiphytes attached to other algae.

Ecology 
Marine populations of Bangia in the Atlantic Ocean are common food for the periwinkle Littorina littorea.

Reproduction 
Species of Bangia undergo a heteromorphic alternation of generation life cycle in which the haploid generation is dominant. Reproduction can be either sexual or asexual; sexual plants occur mainly during the cold season of the year, while at other times the thalli often bear monosporangia only. Bangia, like all Rhodophytes, lack motile sperm and so depend upon water currents to transport their gametes to the trichogyne (receptive area of the female gamete or carpogonium).

All sexual reproduction in rhodophytes is oogamous. Carposporangia are formed through direct division of the zygote. Carpospores germinate to form the diploid filamentous conchocelis phase, which produces conchosporangial branches bearing conchosporangia, each containing a single conchospore. These conchospores then germinate to form gametophytes. During the "conchocelis stage", the plants can also self-replicate using monospores. The monospores develop directly into new plants and may germinate within the sporangia.

Scientific interest 
Silicified peritidal carbonate rocks have been found off Somerset Island, arctic Canada, which contain fossils of well-preserved bangiophyte red algae (Bangiomorpha). Because these fossils have multiseriate filaments derived by longitudinal divisions from uniseriate filaments, taxonomists believe that these fossils are related to Bangia. This resolution distinguished these fossils from other pre-Ediacaran eukaryotes and contributes to evidence that multicellular algae diversified before the Ediacaran radiation of large animals.

Related genera 
Bangiadulcis and Pseudobangia were previously thought to be part of the genus Bangia. However, it has since been discovered that these plants can only undergo asexual reproduction through the formation of archaeosporangia. In fact, sexual reproduction has so far only been recorded in Bangia, Porphyra, Erythrotrichia and Erythrocladia.

Etymology 
The genus was named after Niels Hofman Bang (1803-1886), the Danish patron of Hans Christian Lyngbye, who described the genus.

References 

 Brodie, Juliet A., and Irvine, Linda M. “Volume I Rhodophyta Part 3B Bangiophycidae.” Seaweeds of the British Isles. The Natural History Museum. St. Edmundsbury Press Ltd., 2003. pp 91–92
 Butterfiled, Nicholas J; Knoll, Andrew H; Sweet, Keene. “A Bangiophyte Red Alga from the Proterozoic of Arctic Canada.” Science, New Series, Vol. 250, No. 4977, 1990. pp 104–107
 Fritsch, F.E. “Structure and Reproduction of the Algae Volume II.” Cambridge University Press 1945. pp 397–398, 415, 423-424, 431, 433-435
 Garbary, David, J; Hansen, Gayle I; Scagel, Robert F. “The Marine Algae of British Columbia and Northern Washington: Division Rhodophyta (Red Algae), Class Bangiophyceae.” Dept. of Botany, University of British Columbia, Vancouver, Canada. 1980. pp 139–142 and 164-165

Further reading
Sheath, R.G. (2003). Red Algae. In: Freshwater Algae of North America, Ecology & Classification. (Wehr, J.D. & Sheath, R.G. Eds), pp. 197–224. San Diego: Academic Press.
Silva, P.C.; Basson, P.W.; Moe, R.L. (1996). Catalogue of the Benthic Marine Algae of the Indian Ocean. University of California Publications in Botany. 79, xiv+1259 pp. , available online at https://books.google.com/books?id=vuWEemVY8WEC&pg=PA5
Silva, P.C. & Nelson, W.A. (2008). History of the typification of conserved and rejected names, including an account of the typification of Bangia Lyngb. (Bangiaceae, Rhodophyta). Taxon 57: 1351-1354.
Sutherland, J.E., Lindstrom, S.C., Nelson, W.A., Brodie, J., Lynch, M.D., Hwang, M.S., Choi, H.-G., Miyata, M., Kikuchi, N., Oliveira, M.C., Farr, T., Neefus, C., Mols-Mortensen, A. Milstein, D. & Müller, K.M. (2011). A new look at an ancient order: generic revision of the Bangiales (Rhodophyta). Journal of Phycology 47(5): 1131-1151.

Red algae genera
Bangiophyceae